This is a list of state highways in Bihar, India.

Introduction

List of state highways in Bihar

See also
Bihar State Road Development Corporation
Bihar State Road Transport Corporation

References 

Bihar NIC Site

External links 
 

State Highways
 
Bihar State Highways
State Highways